Zduny  is a village in Łowicz County, Łódź Voivodeship, in central Poland. It is the seat of the gmina (administrative district) called Gmina Zduny.

The village has a population of 693.

References
 Central Statistical Office (GUS) Population: Size and Structure by Administrative Division - (2007-12-31) (in Polish)

Villages in Łowicz County
Łódź Voivodeship (1919–1939)